Suat Atalık (born October 10, 1964) is a Turkish-Bosnian chess grandmaster. He is a three-time Turkish Chess Champion.

Chess career

He was born in Turkey in 1964, represented Turkey in the World Junior Chess Championship in 1983, and was their top board for several Chess Olympiads.

Despite this, and his current residence in Istanbul, he had disputes with chess organizers in his country, so he declared himself to be a resident of Bosnia and Herzegovina, his ancestral home.

During the 2000 Chess Olympiad in Istanbul, Atalik insisted on playing for Bosnia rather than Turkey. As a result, the organizers of the Olympiad banned him from the competition. After the selection of the new national chess federation he returned to the Turkish national team.

In 2003, he took first at Mar del Plata. In 2007 he tied for first with Michael Roiz at the Gorenje Valjevo Tournament.

Atalık won the 3rd and 4th Mediterranean Chess Championships in Antalya, Turkey and Cannes, France, respectively.

He was the only Grandmaster registered in the Turkish Chess Federation in Turkey beginning in 1994 and ending in 2005, when Mikhail Gurevich took up residence there.  As of the July 2009 FIDE rating list, he is ranked number 165 in the world and number two in Turkey, behind Gurevich.

Notable games
Suat Atalik vs Gyula Sax, Maroczy mem 1997, Nimzo-Indian Defense: Classical, Noa Variation, San Remo Variation (E37), 1-0
Florian Handke vs Suat Atalik, 16th open 2000, King's Indian Defense: Orthodox Variation, Donner Defense (E94), 0-1
Zurab Sturua vs Suat Atalik, Bled Olympiad 2002, Slav Defense: Chameleon Variation, Advance System (D15), 0-1
Suat Atalik vs Pablo Zarnicki, Bled Olympiad 2002, Queen's Indian Defense: Kasparov-Petrosian. Classical Variation (E12), 1-0

Personal life
He attended Galatasaray Lycee and studied Psychology in Boğaziçi University. On November 11, 2005 he married 22-year-old woman grandmaster Ekaterina Polovnikova from Russia.  Former world championship challenger Nigel Short, who also played in the World Junior Championship in 1983, was his best man.

References

External links 

 
 
 
 Chessbase News Reports: Grandmaster Atalik marries Woman Grandmaster Ekaterina Polovnikova
 Video Interview with Suat Atalık
 

1964 births
Living people
Turkish chess players
Bosnia and Herzegovina chess players
Serbian chess players
Chess grandmasters
Chess Olympiad competitors
Turkish people of Bosnia and Herzegovina descent
Sportspeople from Istanbul
Galatasaray High School alumni
Boğaziçi University alumni